Eccleston Park railway station serves the Eccleston Park area of St Helens, Merseyside, England. The station, and all trains serving it, are operated by Northern Trains, however the station is branded Merseytravel using Merseytravel ticketing. It was opened by the London & North Western Railway in July 1891.

Electrification of this line was given the go-ahead in November 2010. On 17 May 2015, electric train services began on the Liverpool to Wigan line, operating Class 319 electric multiple units.

Facilities
Though run by Northern Trains, it is within the Merseytravel area and thus has a ticket office that is staffed throughout the hours of service each day (05:50-23:30 Mondays to Saturdays; closed Sundays).  This is located in the main building on platform 1, along with a waiting room whilst there is a shelter on platform 2.  Train running information is provided via customer help points, PIS screens and timetable poster boards on each platform.  Step-free access is available to both platforms via ramps.

Services

Since 10 December 2017, there has been an hourly service on Sundays, to  northbound and Liverpool Lime Street southbound.

Gallery

References

External links

Railway stations in St Helens, Merseyside
DfT Category E stations
Former London and North Western Railway stations
Railway stations in Great Britain opened in 1891
Northern franchise railway stations